Corners is an unincorporated community in Saint Mary's Township in Perry County, Missouri, United States.
Corners is situated in the southwest corner of Perry County, near the St. Francois County line, northwest of Yount. The name is presumed to have been derived from its location in the corner of Perry County, as with Crossroads.

References 

Unincorporated communities in Perry County, Missouri
Unincorporated communities in Missouri